Saifullah Sarwar Khan Niazi is a Pakistani politician who has been a Member of the Senate of Pakistan, since March 2021.
He got arrested from senate on 7-10-22.
He is also currently serving as Chief Organizer of Pakistan Tehreek-e-Insaf (PTI) since March 2019. He is one of the founding members of PTI, joining it in 1996. He was the polling agent for Imran Khan when he unsuccessfully contested election in 1997. He got elected unopposed in 2021 Senate Elections from Punjab.

References

Pakistan Tehreek-e-Insaf politicians
Members of the Senate of Pakistan
Living people
Year of birth missing (living people)
Place of birth missing (living people)